Cattleya walkeriana, or Walker's cattleya, is a species of orchid.  It differs from most species of Cattleya by having inflorescences which arise from the rhizome instead of from the apex of the pseudobulb. In its native habitat (Brazilian Central Plateau) it grows as either an epiphyte or a lithophyte, sometimes in full sun. Pseudobulbs are relatively short, bulbous or fusiform, with one or two ovate leaves at the apex. Inflorescence is one- or few-flowered, about 8" (20 cm) tall. Flowers are 4-5" (9-12 cm) across.

Genetically C. walkeriana is close to bifoliate Cattleyas. The diploid chromosome number of C. walkeriana has been twice determined as 2n = 40; the diploid chromosome number of the variety C. walkeriana var. princeps L.C.Menzes has been determined as 2n = 80.

Notes

References

External links

walkeriana